Verkhotursky uyezd was an administrative division (an uyezd) of Perm Governorate in the Russian Empire, which existed in 1781–1923. Its seat was in the town of Verkhoturye and its area was

Demographics
Its population, according to the Russian Empire Census of 1897, was 270,866. Of those, 96.8% spoke Russian, 1.0% Tatar, 0.7% Mansi, 0.7% Ukrainian, 0.5% Komi-Zyrian, 0.1% Bashkir, and 0.1% Belarusian as their first language.

References
Энциклопедический словарь Брокгауза и Ефрона: В 86 томах (82 т. и 4 доп.). — СПб., 1890—1907.

 
Uezds of Perm Governorate
States and territories established in 1781
States and territories disestablished in 1923
History of Sverdlovsk Oblast